is a Japanese language neologism used to describe young Japanese who have seemingly achieved the Buddhist enlightened state free from material desires but who have in reality given up ambition and hope due to macro-economic trends. The term was coined around 2010. The  Satori generation are not interested in earning money, career advancement, and conspicuous consumption, or even travel, hobbies and romantic relationships; their alcohol consumption is far lower than Japanese of earlier generations. They live in a period of Waithood and are NEET, parasite singles, freeters or hikikomori. The Satori generation in Japan is roughly equivalent to the Sampo generation in Korea, and is somewhat similar to the Strawberry generation in Taiwan.

See also 
 9X Generation
 Buddha-like mindset
 N-po generation
 Tang ping

References

External links 
Gen X? Millennials? A Quick Guide to Japan’s Generation Cohorts

economy of Japan
Demographics of Japan
neologisms
Cultural generations
Japanese culture